Aberlour House is the junior school of Gordonstoun School, and is now fully merged with it. It educated pupils from age 6 to 13.

The links between Aberlour House and Gordonstoun were very close. They shared the same school song and school flag (purple and white). Furthermore, they shared the same school motto – "plus est en vous", a contraction of "plus est en vous que vous pensez" meaning, "there is more in you than you think". They were both founded by the German educationalist Dr Kurt Hahn. His bust was prominently displayed in Aberlour House's front hall for many years.

The prep school was founded at Wester Elchies in 1936 – three years after Gordonstoun. Wester Elchies expanded such that in 1947 a modest stately home – Aberlour House – was bought. Charles Brereton was appointed headmaster by Kurt Hahn. Aberlour House had been occupied by the Army during the Second World War and is three miles from Wester Elchies.

The younger boys attended Wester Elchies until the age of about 10. Then they proceeded on to Aberlour House. They moved on to Gordonstoun at the age of 13. Wester Elchies got dry rot and had to be pulled down in the early 1960s. A dormitory at Aberlour House was named Wester Elchies in memory of the old school building. Other dormitories took their names from local castles such as Cawdor, Spynie, Darnaway, Gaudwell, Balvenie, Duffus, Lochindorb, Auchindoun, Towie Barclay, Kilvarock, Findlater, Brodie and Glamis.

Because of Wester Elchies' foundation date Aberlour House celebrated its Golden Jubilee in 1986. The school went mixed in 1974 – the same year as Gordonstoun took girls although sisters of boys at Wester Elchies had been admitted during and shortly after World War II.

Sir Toby Coghill, Bt  (1930–2000), was headmaster of Aberlour House 1964–89. He was an old boy of Gordonstoun and a graduate of Pembroke College, Cambridge, where he read Architecture and attained 'blues' in rowing and ice hockey. Previously he had been a housemaster at Aiglon College, a  Round Square affiliated school in Switzerland and became chairman of the board of governors upon retirement. His ancestor was Nevill Coghill (VC) who died attempting to save the colours at Isandhlwana. Coghill was an Irishman from Castletownshend, County Cork. He died in 2000 at the age of 70. Headmasters after him included Brian Head (1989–90), a Yorkshireman named David Edward Hanson (1990), a Scotsman, John Caithness (1990–2000) and then an Englishman by the name of Neil Wainwright Gardner.

Aberlour House enjoyed a short-lived fillip in 1993 when a local rival Blairmore School shut down. Aberlour took in many Blairmore pupils, appropriated Blairmore's scholarship boards and adopted Blairmore's Highland games event.

Aberlour House never appended the word 'school' to its name even when it was separate from Gordonstoun. Although the Preparatory School still keeps its name (Aberlour House) it is now located within the grounds of Gordonstoun School.

Wester Elchies
The first preparatory school was founded in 1936 at Wester Elchies and unlike Gordonstoun, was not made to move during the war. At the start of the war there were 40 boys and girls attending and these numbers increased to the point that a second school was opened at Aberlour House in 1947  by which time nearly 100 pupils were attending.

Wester Elchies was pulled down in the early 1960s because of dilapidation. The prep school continued with just Aberlour but even so there were always problems with the  that separated the main Gordonstoun campus and the school. In 2004 this was amended with the construction of a purpose-built prep school on the main campus. In January 2007 the disused Aberlour House became the head offices of Walkers Shortbread, whose main factory complex at Fisherton is adjacent to the house.

Present day
Presently Aberlour House has approximately 115 pupils between the ages of 6 and 13 attending. Although they form part of the same institution, going to Aberlour is not a prerequisite of going to Gordonstoun and neither is it enforced that pupils at Aberlour House continue on into Gordonstoun.

References

Independent schools in Moray
Boarding schools in Moray
Defunct boarding schools in Scotland
Defunct private schools in Scotland
Defunct preparatory schools in Scotland